God's Wife is a 2012 novel by Henry Baum. It follows the experiences of blogger Shirley Shave, a female protagonist as she becomes a porn star, a prostitute and finally a cult leader. In 2013, the book was honored as one of seven finalists at the Sexual Freedom Awards in the United Kingdom. Other finalists include Pamela Stephenson, Alan Moore, and Belle de Jour, who won.

References

2012 American novels